Villa Estense is a comune (municipality) in the Province of Padua in the Italian region Veneto, located about  southwest of Venice and about  southwest of Padua.

Villa Estense borders the following municipalities: Este, Granze, Sant'Elena, Sant'Urbano, Vescovana, Vighizzolo d'Este.

Demographic evolution

References

Cities and towns in Veneto